Now That's What I Call Music! 4 was released on July 18, 2000. The album is the fourth edition of the Now! series released in the United States. It debuted at number one on the Billboard 200 albums chart. This was the first album in the American series to reach number one and marked "the first time ever that an album of previously released hits has debuted at number one in the U.S."

Two tracks on the album, "I Knew I Loved You" and "Try Again", were number-one songs on the Billboard Hot 100. In February 2001, it was certified 2× Platinum by the RIAA.

Track listing

* The version of "(You Drive Me) Crazy" is not the popular The Stop Remix! played on U.S. radio stations, but the original ...Baby One More Time album version.

Charts

Weekly charts

Year-end charts

See also 
List of number-one albums of 2000 (U.S.)

References

2000 compilation albums
 004
Universal Music Group compilation albums